Dākṣāyaṇī is a name of Sati (Hindu goddess). Dakshayani may also refer to:

Dakshayani Velayudhan, Indian politician
Chengalloor Dakshayani, Indian elephant